Much Ado About Nothing is a 2012 American romantic comedy film written, produced, directed, edited, and composed by Joss Whedon,  based on William Shakespeare's play of the same name. The film stars Amy Acker, Alexis Denisof, Nathan Fillion, Clark Gregg, Reed Diamond, Fran Kranz, Sean Maher, and Jillian Morgese.

To create the film, director Whedon established the production studio Bellwether Pictures. The film premiered at the 2012 Toronto International Film Festival and had its North American theatrical release on June 21, 2013.

Plot
The plot of the film is largely unchanged from that of Shakespeare's original play. Differences include the modern-day setting, switching Conrade's gender, eliminating several minor roles and consolidating others into Leonato's aide, and expanding Ursula's role by giving her a number of Margaret's scenes.  In addition, the film attempts to add background to the relationship between Beatrice and Benedick by showing, in an opening scene, a morning after they apparently slept together. Benedick steals away quietly while Beatrice pretends to be asleep.  Benedick is beardless, so this is presumably some time before the plot of the movie takes place.

Cast
 Amy Acker as Beatrice, niece of Leonato.
 Alexis Denisof as Benedick, of Padua; companion of Don Pedro.
 Reed Diamond as Don Pedro, Prince of Aragon.
 Nathan Fillion as Dogberry, the constable in charge of Messina's night watch.
 Clark Gregg as Leonato, governor of Messina; Hero's father.
 Fran Kranz as Claudio, of Florence; a count, companion of Don Pedro, friend to Benedick.
 Sean Maher as Don John, "the Bastard Prince," brother of Don Pedro.
 Jillian Morgese as Hero, Leonato's daughter.
 Spencer Treat Clark as Borachio, follower of Don John.
 Riki Lindhome as Conrade, lover of Don John (originally, follower of Don John, a male role).
 Ashley Johnson as Margaret, waiting-gentlewoman attendant on Hero.
 Emma Bates as Ursula, waiting-gentlewoman attendant on Hero.
 Tom Lenk as Verges, the Headborough, Dogberry's partner
 Nick Kocher as first watchman
 Brian McElhaney as second watchman
 Joshua Zar as Leonato's aide
 Paul M. Meston as Friar Francis, a priest.
 Romy Rosemont as The Sexton, the district attorney at Borachio and Conrade's interrogation (originally, the judge at the trial of Borachio, a male role).

Anthony Head was originally intended for the role of Leonato, but was unavailable. Clark Gregg had worked with Whedon on The Avengers at the time, and stepped in to play the part. Most of the cast had worked with Whedon before: Acker and Denisof on Angel; Denisof, Fillion, Lenk, and Lindhome on Buffy the Vampire Slayer; Fillion and Maher on Firefly; Acker, Denisof, Diamond, Kranz, and Johnson on Dollhouse; Gregg, Denisof, Rosemont, Johnson, and Morgese in The Avengers.

Production
Principal photography started mid-October 2011, and took place at Joss Whedon's residence in Santa Monica, California. On the choice of location, he told Studio 360, "First of all, my wife built that house. And I knew from the moment I set foot in it that I would want to film something there. Because it's all in one place, that place informs the mood and the feeling and the look of the picture so much, and I was really already comfortable with that". Whedon and his wife, Kai Cole, produced the film through their studio Bellwether Pictures. It was filmed entirely in a black-and-white palette over a period of 12 days, in conjunction with cinematographer Jay Hunter. Whedon shot it while on a contractual vacation from the post-production of The Avengers. The cast and crew were informed to keep the project a secret until production was finished. They wrapped their last day of filming on October 23, 2011.

Whedon explained his initial interest in the project, saying:

He elaborated on that sentiment, and said "It's a very cynically romantic text about love, and how we behave, and how we're expected to behave. It's a party, but there's something darker there as well". Inspired by the exposing nature of film, Whedon decided to infuse a recurring motif of sexuality, "...because it's a visual medium. You can say it or you can show it. ... There's an element to it, of debauchery, that was fun for a time but then it was just sort of dark". Whedon's idea to adapt the play for the screen originated from having "Shakespeare readings" at his house with several of his friends, years prior.

Whedon and his director of photography Jay Hunter took advantage of natural lighting in order to make it feel "very found", noting, "Our lighting package rose in the east and set in the west". Using mirrors, glass and windows to shoot through, he explains, "[It's] something I'd like to do all the time, but particularly in a movie that's all about lies, and manipulation and misunderstandings. The more you can warp the frame a little bit, the more it speaks towards what's going on". The film was shot hand-held, digitally with multiple cameras, often with a RED Epic, and used a Lensbaby Composer with Double Glass lens on a Canon 7D to differentiate certain scenes.

Soundtrack

Whedon composed the score for the film and recruited Deborah Lurie to produce. He arranged music to "Sigh No More" and "Heavily", two songs that William Shakespeare had written into the play. These tracks were performed by Maurissa Tancharoen and Jed Whedon. Whedon described the experience of making his debut in scoring a film as "terrifying", going on to say that "when I'm terrified, I know I'm having fun". He acknowledged as well that hiring himself to do it resulted from monetary constraints. The soundtrack was released digitally on June 6, 2013.

Release

Much Ado About Nothing had its world premiere at the 2012 Toronto International Film Festival. The film's North American distribution rights were acquired by Lionsgate, in association with Roadside Attractions, for a joint theatrical release. It was later reported that the film would have a limited theatrical release on June 7, 2013. Kaleidoscope Film Distribution obtained worldwide sales and UK distribution rights. European premieres have been held at the 2013 Jameson Dublin International Film Festival, the 2013 Glasgow Film Festival, the 2013 Istanbul Film Festival, the 2013 Bradford International Film Festival, the 2013 Belfast Film Festival, the 2013 Filmfest München, the 2013 Athens International Film Festival and the 2013 Helsinki Film Festival. The film premiered in the United States at the 2013 South by Southwest Film Festival, followed by the 2013 Wisconsin Film Festival, the 2013 San Francisco International Film Festival, the 2013 Independent Film Festival of Boston and the 2013 Seattle International Film Festival. The limited release in New York City, Los Angeles and San Francisco was expanded on June 14, 2013. On June 21, 2013, it released in 200-300 screens nationwide.

Rating
Much Ado About Nothing was officially given a PG-13 rating by the MPAA for American cinemas. It got a 12A certificate in the United Kingdom from the British Board of Film Classification.

International releases
Sharmill Films distributed the film to Australian theaters. It was shown at the New Zealand International Film Festival in July 2013. The film was released theatrically in the United Kingdom.

Reception

Box office

North America
In limited release and playing in only five theaters in New York City, Los Angeles and San Francisco, it grossed $71,000 on its first day. At the end of its opening weekend, it had grossed $183,400. The $15,027 it made at the Lincoln Film Center Society Theater broke the venue's house record. With the expansion into 18 additional theaters in the second week of its limited release, the film garnered an amount of $162,580.

The first weekend of wide release in the U.S. grossed $762,350 from 206 theaters, which accumulated a total amount of $1,234,781 since release. It earned $590,000 after the second week. The fourth week held an overall aggregate of $263,700. Domestic total gross amounted to $4,328,850.

Other territories
The film's opening weekend in the United Kingdom grossed $101,237 from having been screened at 64 locations. The box office numbers for Australia's opening weekend amounted to $78,196. The international box office contributed $971,794 to the film's final cumulative total.

Critical reaction
Much Ado About Nothing has received generally positive reviews from critics, earning an 86% approval rating on Rotten Tomatoes with an average rating of 7.60/10, based on 176 reviews. The website's critical consensus reads: "Lighthearted to a fault, Much Ado About Nothings giddy energy and intimate charm make for an entertaining romantic comedy—and a Shakespearean adaptation that's hard to resist". On Metacritic, the film has achieved an average score of 78/100 based on 37 reviews, signifying "generally favorable reviews".

John DeFore of The Hollywood Reporter gave a positive review of the film, remarking, "...more than most adaptations, this is a film true to Shakespeare's practice of employing all means at hand to keep the crowd entertained". Tom Clift of Moviedex complimented the director's use of subtle visual humor, while Lou Lumenick of the New York Post commented that "this is the funniest Shakespeare film I can recall seeing". The Guardian scored the film four out of five stars, calling it "...the first great contemporary Shakespeare since Baz Luhrmann's Romeo and Juliet". Christopher Schobert of IndieWire wrote, "The result is an utter joy, Whedon's most emotionally resonant and fully realized feature film to date. And I say that as one who is not a devoted member of the Whedon army". Sheila O'Malley of the Chicago Sun-Times gave the film four out of four stars, noting that "Much Ado About Nothing is one of the best films of the year". 

BBC Radio 5 Live's Mark Kermode said of the film, "One of the things that it manages to do is, firstly, make all the dialogue and the language completely comprehensible". He proceeded to note that "it makes sense to its audience. I think that the comedy is funny, and I don't say that lightly. ... And finally, I think in terms of the way in which it deals with that gender politics issue is really well done. ... It's a very hard trick to pull off, and he did it in two weeks!" Helen O'Hara of Empire believed that, while keeping a sense of noir to compensate the romance, it was "in balancing these competing elements and characters that this version really shines". The Village Voices Chris Packham said that the director "approaches the story with a tremendous amount of joy".

Associated Press reviewer Jake Coyle wrote that "moviegoers will likely have few better options this summer for a good romantic comedy". A. O. Scott of The New York Times called it "the liveliest and most purely delightful movie I have seen so far this year", concluding to laud the film for its "sly, robust eroticism". Andrew O'Hehir of Salon wrote, "[It] possesses that Whedon-esque nerdy energy, fizzing with humor, eroticism, booze and more than a hint of danger". Kenneth Turan of the Los Angeles Times thought the film was "good-humored and unpretentious in equal measure", going on to praise its visual performance. IGN gave it a 7.5 out of 10, noting that "everyone should see this movie". 

Joe Morgenstern of The Wall Street Journal gave high encomium to Kranz's performance, expressing that the actor "portrays Claudio with affecting passion", and says of the film, "The joyous spirit of the play has been preserved in this modest, homegrown production". Rolling Stone journalist Peter Travers wrote that the film was "an irresistible blend of mirth and malice". Justin Chang of Variety sensed that the black-and-white evoked a "timeless romanticism", which was additionally enhanced by the "lightly applied score". Chris Nashawaty of Entertainment Weekly—despite commending it for being "both daring and delightfully daffy"—admits, "The film isn't as fast and funny as it could be".

Top ten lists
 4th – David Edelstein, Vulture
 4th – Stephanie Zacharek, The Village Voice
 9th – Lou Lumenick, New York Post
 Top 10 (listed alphabetically, not ranked) – National Board of Review

Accolades

Home media
Much Ado About Nothing was released on Blu-ray Disc and DVD on October 8, 2013. The film's US Blu-ray Disc features 1080p video, DTS-HD Master Audio 5.1 surround, an UltraViolet digital copy, a music video for "Sigh No More" (one of the songs from the soundtrack), two audio commentaries and two featurettes. Much Ado About Nothing was awarded the Guinness World Record for having the most people record a Blu-ray or DVD commentary – 16.

See also
 List of black-and-white films produced since 1970

References

External links
 
 
 
 

Films based on Much Ado About Nothing
2012 films
2012 romantic comedy films
American romantic comedy films
Films directed by Joss Whedon
Films with screenplays by Joss Whedon
American films based on plays
American black-and-white films
Films set in Sicily
Films shot in California
American independent films
Lionsgate films
Roadside Attractions films
Modern adaptations of works by William Shakespeare
2012 independent films
Films produced by Joss Whedon
2010s English-language films
2010s American films